Greek phonology may refer to:
Ancient Greek phonology, discussing the classical language
Koine Greek phonology, discussing the developments between Classical and Modern Greek
Modern Greek phonology, discussing the modern language